The 2023 Netball Superleague season is the eighteenth season of the Netball Superleague, the elite domestic netball competition in the United Kingdom. Manchester Thunder are the defending champions, as they won the 2022 Grand final. The season began on 11 February and is scheduled to  end with the Grand final on 11 June. It features 10 teams following the removal of Wasps in November 2022.

Overview

Format
Originally, the 2023 season was scheduled to have 11 teams. However, in November 2022, Wasps were removed from the league after their holding company went into administration, leaving the competition with 10 teams. The season is set to begin on 11 February and end with the Grand final on 11 June. The original fixture list was announced on 10 October 2022, and was amended in November 2022 to cater for the 10-team season. The first round of fixtures were all held at the Motorpoint Arena Nottingham.

Teams

Source:

Transfers
The original transfer window closed in October 2022. Team Bath re-signed former player Kadeen Corbin from Saracens Mavericks. Celtic Dragons signed Gabby Sinclair from Australian team Collingwood Magpies. London Pulse signed Jade Clarke and Chelsea Pitman. Loughborough Lightning signed Jasmin Odeogberin and Rhea Dixon. 2022 winners Manchester Thunder signed Lenize Potgieter. Thunder lost Eleanor Cardwell, Joyce Mvula and Laura Malcolm, all of whom chose to play abroad in Australia or New Zealand, as well as Jade Clarke, who transferred to London Pulse for the 2023 season. Saracens Mavericks signed Kira Rothwell from London Pulse. Strathclyde Sirens signed Ugandan international Stella Oyella, and Surrey Storm signed Layla Guscoth and Sophie Drakeford-Lewis from Team Bath.

Following Wasps' removal from the competition, the transfer window was re-opened to allow Wasps players to sign for other teams. Chloe Essam and Rachel Fee signed for Severn Stars, Georgia Lees signed for Saracens Mavericks, Josie Huckle signed for Manchester Thunder and both Lauren Nicholls and Alex Johnson signed for Loughborough Lightning.

Table

League stage
Source:

Round 1

Round 2

Round 3

Round 4

Round 5

Round 6

Round 7

References

External links
 Official Website

2023
2023 in English netball
2023 in Welsh women's sport
2023 in Scottish women's sport
2023 in English women's sport